Mesquite Arena is a 7,000-seat multi-purpose arena in Mesquite, Texas, United States. It is home to the Mesquite Championship Rodeo and the Mesquite Outlaws indoor soccer team of the Major Arena Soccer League.

The arena has been holding events since 1985. The types of events in the modern age currently include rodeos, monster truck wars, boxing, and concerts. However, the arena is also available for other major events and can host groups of people up to 7,000. From early June to the end of August, however, the arena is occupied by the Mesquite Championship Rodeo and is not available then. Otherwise, though, the arena can be reserved for such events as business meetings, family reunions, trade shows, holiday parties, weddings and receptions, birthday parties, and company training.

Rodeo and other events 
The rodeo features bull riding with many amenities and top riders. Recent country music concerts have featured Travis Tritt, The Charlie Daniels Band, Diamond Rio, Clay Walker, and Mark Chesnutt.

References

External links
 Official Website

Mesquite, Texas
Indoor arenas in Texas
Sports venues in Texas
Rodeo venues in the United States
Indoor soccer venues in the United States
1985 establishments in Texas
Sports venues completed in 1985